KERR (750 AM, "KERR Country") is a radio station licensed to serve Polson, Montana.  The station is owned by Anderson Radio Broadcasting, Inc.  It airs a country music format.

The station was assigned the KERR call letters by the Federal Communications Commission.

KERR is Montana's primary entry point station for the Emergency Alert System.

References

External links
KERR official website
Anderson Radio Broadcasting

ERR
Country radio stations in the United States